Lenae Teresa Williams  (born July 14, 1979) is an American professional basketball player.  A 6'1" guard-forward from Addison, Illinois and DePaul University, she played 27 games for the Detroit Shock of the WNBA in 2002. She averaged 2.7 points per game in her WNBA career.

She currently plays for the ESB Villeneuve-d'Ascq team.

Career highlights 
All-Conference USA First Team (2002)
All C-USA Second Team (2000, 2001)
AP All-America honorable mention (2002)
C-USA All-Freshman Team (1999)
Holds C-USA career record for three-point field goals made (330) and attempted (924)
Set C-USA records for three-pointers made in a season (94) and a game (8) as a sophomore

References

1979 births
Living people
American expatriate basketball people in France
American women's basketball players
Basketball players from Chicago
People from Addison, Illinois
DePaul Blue Demons women's basketball players
Detroit Shock players
Small forwards